The 2004 New Jersey Democratic presidential primary was held on June 8, 2004, and featured the two candidates who were still campaigning for the nomination: presumptive nominee Senator John Kerry of Massachusetts and congressman Dennis Kucinich of Ohio. Kerry won a landslide victory at 92% to Kucinich's 4%.

New Jersey
2004 New Jersey elections
New Jersey Democratic primaries